Emilio Nava (born 2 December 2001) is an American professional tennis player. Nava has a career-high ATP singles ranking of No. 173 achieved on 19 September 2022. He reached two finals of the Boys' Singles Grand Slam tournaments, losing to Lorenzo Musetti in the 2019 Australian Open and to Jonáš Forejtek in the 2019 US Open.

Early life and background
Nava is the son of Olympic sprinter Eduardo Nava and professional tennis player Xóchitl Escobedo, both of whom are originally from Mexico.  He is also the cousin of fellow pro tennis player Ernesto Escobedo. His brother, Eduardo Nava also is a professional tennis player who played college tennis at TCU and Wake Forest University.

Professional career

2019: ATP main draw debut
Nava made his ATP main draw debut at the 2019 Abierto Mexicano Telcel after receiving a wildcard into the singles main draw. He lost to Mackenzie McDonald in the first round.

2021: Masters 1000, Grand Slam and top 350 debuts
At the 2021 Miami Open, Nava qualified for the main draw to make his debut at ATP Masters 1000 level but lost in the first round to Lloyd Harris.

Nava made his grand slam debut at the 2021 US Open after being given a wildcard for the singles main draw. He lost to Lorenzo Musetti in the first round.

2022: Maiden Challenger title
At the 2022 Shymkent Challenger, Nava won his first challenger title after defeating Sebastian Fanselow in the final.

ATP Challenger and ITF Futures finals

Singles: 3 (2–1)

Doubles: 2 (1–1)

Junior Grand Slam finals

Singles: 2 (2 runner-ups)

Doubles: 2 (2 runner-ups)

References

External links

 
 
 
 

2001 births
Living people
American male tennis players
American sportspeople of Mexican descent
Tennis players from Los Angeles